Materoa Reedy (née Ngarimu, 1881–1944) was a New Zealand tribal leader.

Of Māori descent, she identified with the Ngati Porou iwi. She was born in Maraeke, East Coast, New Zealand in 1881, the daughter of Tuta Ngarimu and Makere Rairi.

Reedy attended the Hukarere Native School for Girls. She married John Marshall Reedy, the eldest son of Thomas Tyne Reedy, an Irishman, and Mihi Takawhenua Ngawiki Tuhou. Their eldest son was Hanara (Arnold) Tangiawha Te Ohaki Reedy. Victoria Cross winner Moana-Nui-a-Kiwa Ngarimu was her brother's son.

References

1881 births
1944 deaths
People from the Gisborne District
Ngāti Porou people
People educated at Hukarere Girls' College